Roxburgh is a surname. It is an ancient Scottish surname, locational in origin, from the place called Roxburgh near Kelso in what is now the Borders council area of Scotland, formerly Roxburghshire. 

Notable people with the surname include:

Alec Roxburgh (1910–1985), Scottish footballer
Andy Roxburgh (born 1943), Scottish footballer and manager
Doug Roxburgh (born 1951), Canadian golfer
Edwin Roxburgh (born 1937), English composer 
J. F. Roxburgh (1888–1954), British schoolmaster and author
James William Roxburgh (1921–2007), Anglican Bishop of Barking
Jim Roxburgh (1858-1934), baseball player
John Roxburgh (disambiguation)
Melissa Roxburgh (born 1992), Canadian actress
Richard Roxburgh (born 1962), Australian actor
William Roxburgh (1751–1815), Scottish surgeon and botanist, abbreviated as "Roxb."

Scottish surnames